Brouncker is a surname. Notable people with the surname include:

William Brouncker (disambiguation), multiple people
Henry Brouncker (disambiguation), multiple people
Viscount Brouncker
Edward Brouncker, 17th-century Anglican priest